North Market Street Historic District is a national historic district located at Washington, Beaufort County, North Carolina. It encompasses 313 contributing buildings, 1 contributing structure, and 3 contributing objects in a primarily residential section of Washington. Known as Nicholsonville, it was first platted in 1893, and enlarged in 1896 and in 1910. Stylistic influences include Late Victorian, Colonial Revival, Neoclassical, and Mission, and the American Craftsman / Bungalow-styles.

It was listed on the National Register of Historic Places in 2011.

References

Historic districts on the National Register of Historic Places in North Carolina
Houses on the National Register of Historic Places in North Carolina
Houses in Beaufort County, North Carolina
National Register of Historic Places in Beaufort County, North Carolina